My Best Friend Daniel is an EP released by Montreal-based indie band The Lovely Feathers on September 6, 2004.  The EP features different versions of several songs that appeared on the band's album Hind Hind Legs, as well as other material.  It was rereleased by Equator Records on December 12, 2006.

Track listing
 "Fudgicle"
 "Iceberg"
 "Like You"
 "The Lion Eats the Wildebeest"
 "Upon Milwaukee's Patio" (Instrumental)
 "Cadillac Back-Pack"
 "Orchids"
 "Photocorners"
 "The Only Appalachian Cornfield"
 "Lawrenceville Blazer"
 "The Bronze"
 "Force Fire Force"
 "Wrong Choice"

Personnel

Mark Kupfert - Vocals, Guitar

Richard Yonofsky - Vocals, Guitar

Noah Bernamoff - Bass

Daniel Suss - Keyboard, Vocals

Ted Suss - Drums

External links

References

2004 albums
The Lovely Feathers albums